Metoecis is a monotypic snout moth genus described by Paul Mabille in 1879. Its only species, Metoecis carnifex, was described by Charles Coquerel in 1855. It is found on Madagascar and South Africa.

The larvae are parasitic on Anaphe infraeta. They perforate the newly formed cocoons and pupate within the cocoon envelope.

References

Moths described in 1855
Phycitinae
Moths of Madagascar
Moths of Africa
Monotypic moth genera